Maria Sergeyevna Vinogradova (13 July 1922 –  2 July 1995) was a Russian actress. She appeared in more than one hundred films from 1940 to 1995.

Filmography

References

External links 

1922 births
1995 deaths
Russian film actresses
Soviet film actresses
Russian voice actresses
Soviet voice actresses
Gerasimov Institute of Cinematography alumni
Honored Artists of the RSFSR
20th-century Russian women